San Vicente, officially the Municipality of San Vicente, is a 6th class municipality in the province of Northern Samar, Philippines. According to the 2020 census, it has a population of 6,928 people.

It is an island-municipality composed of seven islands of the Naranjo Island Group: Sila, Tarnate, Sangputan, Panganoron (Medio), Mahaba (Rasa), Maragat (San Andres) and Destacado where the town proper is located. Destacado island is in the southernmost part of the group of islands comprising the municipality.

Locals speak Cebuano language and part Waray-Waray.  According to the 2020 census, it has a population of 6,928 people. It is the smallest municipality in the province, both in area and population.

The island municipality of San Vicente consists of six major islands; Destacado, Panganoron, Mahaba, Maragat, Sila, Tarnate, Sangputan. The islands of Panganoron, Mahaba, Maragat, Sila Tarnate and Sangputan form a circle of island group while Destacado lies in the far south of the group. The seat of government and town center is located in Destacado Island which separated several nautical miles from the rest of the group. Other smaller islands also form part of the municipality of San Vicente.

Geography

Barangays
San Vicente is politically subdivided into 7 barangays.
Destacado Poblacion (Barangay 2)
Maragat (Maragat Island)
Mongol Bongol Poblacio (Barangay 1)
Punta Poblacion (Barangay 3)
Sangputan 
Sila (Sila Island)
Tarnate

Climate

Demographics

Economy

Since San Vicente is an island municipality, the primary source of income is fishing. Tourism is an untapped potential source of livelihood and jobs but it is undeveloped. The islands of Sila, Tarnate, Sangputan, Panganoron, Maragat, Mahaba boast of white sand beaches. At Sila island, a pink sand beach is tucked on its coast.

References

External links
 ELGU Website of San Vicente 
 [ Philippine Standard Geographic Code]
 Philippine Census Information
 Local Governance Performance Management System

Municipalities of Northern Samar
Island municipalities in the Philippines